Darly Noemi Batista (born 8 July 1988) is a Dominican footballer who plays as a forward for Atlético Pantoja in the Liga Dominicana de Fútbol.

Career statistics

International

International goals
Scores and results list Dominican Republic's goal tally first.

References

External links

Darly Batista on LDF

1988 births
Living people
People from Puerto Plata Province
Dominican Republic footballers
Association football forwards
Dominican Republic international footballers
Dominican Republic expatriate footballers
Expatriate footballers in Haiti
Don Bosco FC players
Bauger FC players
Ligue Haïtienne players
Liga Dominicana de Fútbol players